Kenneth Wong (born 22 May 1973) is a Guyanese former cricketer. He played in 23 first-class and 17 List A matches for Guyana from 1992 to 1998. Wong played West Indies ‘B’ team wicketkeeper and batsman.

He served as vice-president of the Roraima Bikers Club in 2009.

See also
 List of Guyanese representative cricketers

References

External links
 

1973 births
Living people
Guyanese cricketers
Guyana cricketers
Sportspeople from Georgetown, Guyana